Chief Victor Olabisi Onabanjo (12 February 1927 – 14 April 1990) was governor of Ogun State in Nigeria from October 1979 – December 1983, during the Nigerian Second Republic. He was of Ijebu extraction.

Background

Oloye Victor Olabisi Onabanjo was born in 1927 in Lagos. He was educated at Baptist Academy in Lagos and at the Regent Street Polytechnic in the United Kingdom, where he studied journalism between 1950 and 1951.
He worked as a journalist for several years before becoming a full-time politician.
His column Aiyekooto (a Yoruba word meaning "parrot" - a creature known in Yoruba mythology for telling the plain truth) appeared in the Daily Service and Daily Express newspapers  between 1954 and 1962.

Political career

Olabisi Onabanjo was elected chairman of the Ijebu Ode Local Government Area in 1977 under the tutelage of Chief Obafemi Awolowo.
He was subsequently elected governor of Ogun State in October 1979 on the Unity Party of Nigeria platform.
He was known as an unpretentious and plain-speaking man, and his administration of Ogun State was considered a model at the time and later.

On May 13, 1982, he commissioned Ogun Television.
The Ogun State University, founded on July 7, 1982, was renamed Olabisi Onabanjo University on May 29th, 2001, in his memory.
He established the Abraham Adesanya Polytechnic. General Oladipo Diya, who became military governor in 1983, closed the school down,  and it remained closed until it was re-opened after the return to democracy in 1999.

Later career

When General Muhammadu Buhari took power in a military coup, he was thrown in jail for several years.
After his eventual release, he returned to journalism, publishing his Aiyekooto column in the Nigerian Tribune from 1987 to 1989.
Chief Onabanjo died on April 14, 1990. Selected articles from his column were published in a book in 1991.

Bibliography

References

1927 births
1990 deaths
Unity Party of Nigeria politicians
Governors of Ogun State
Yoruba politicians
Politicians from Lagos
20th-century Nigerian politicians
Baptist Academy alumni
Alumni of the Regent Street Polytechnic